Kushaniya or al-Kushaniya was a medieval town in the region of Transoxiana, located close to Samarkand, on the northern road between the cities of Samarkand and Bukhara. It was located in the vicinity of the present-day Rabinjan. According to Al-Istakhri, it was two farsakhs (about 10 kilometers) from Rabinjan.

Chinese sources, such as the Book of the Later Han reported its name as "He, also called Kushuangnijia or Guishangni" (何，或曰屈霜你迦，曰贵霜匿).

Notes

References 
Abu al-Fida, Isma'il ibn 'Ali. Mukhtasar Ta'rikh al-Bashar. Trans M. Stanislas Guyard. Paris: L'Imprimerie Nationale, 1883.
Barthold, W. Turkestan Down to the Mongol Invasion. Trans. V. Minorskey. Taipei: Southern Materials Center, 1988.
Buryakov, Y.F., K.M Baipakov, K.H. Tashbaeva, and Y. Takubov. The Cities and Routes of the Great Silk Road: On Central Asian Documents. Tashkent: Sharg, 1999.
Gibb, H.A.R. The Arab Conquests in Central Asia. London: The Royal Asiatic Society, 1923.
Ibn al-Faqih, Abu Bakr Ahmad ibn Muhammad al-Hamadhani. Mukhtasar Kitab al-Buldan. Ed. M.J. de Goeje. Leiden: E.J. Brill, 1885.
Ibn Hawqal, Abu al-Qasim Muhammad. Kitab Surat al-Ardh. Ed. M.J. de Goeje. Leiden: E.J. Brill, 1873.
Ibn Khurradadhbih, Abu al-Qasim 'Abd Allah. Kitab al-Masalik wa'l-Mamalik. Ed and trans. M.J. de Goeje. Leiden: E.J. Brill, 1889.
Al-Istakhri, Abu Ishaq al-Farisi. Kitab al-Masalik wa'l-Mamalik. Ed. M.J. de Goeje. 2nd ed. Leiden: E.J. Brill, 1927.
Le Strange, Guy. The Lands of the Eastern Caliphate: Mesopotamia, Persia, and Central Asia, from the Moslem conquest to the time of Timur. Cambridge: Cambridge University Press, 1905.
Al-Muqaddasi, Muhammad ibn Ahmad. The Best Divisions for Knowledge of the Regions. Trans. Basil Collins. Reading: Garner Publishing Limited, 2001. 
Narshakhi, Abu Bakr Muhammad. Tarikh-i Bukhara. Trans. R.N. Frye, The History of Bukhara. Cambridge, MA: Mediaeval Academy of America, 1954.
Qudama ibn Ja'far. Kitab al-Kharaj. Ed. and trans. M.J. de Goeje. Leiden: E.J. Brill, 1889.
Savchenko, Alexei, and Mark Dickens. "Prester John's Realm: New Light on Christianity Between Merv and Turfan." The Christian Heritage of Iraq: Collected Papers from the Christianity of Iraq I-V Seminar Days. Ed. Erica C.D. Hunter. Piscataway: Gorgias Press, 2009. 
Al-Tabari, Abu Ja'far Muhammad ibn Jarir. The History of al-Tabari. Ed. Ehsan Yar-Shater. 40 vols. Albany, NY: State University of New York Press, 1985-2007.

Destroyed towns
Former populated places in Uzbekistan
Sogdian cities